Antonio Modarelli (1894 in Braddock, Pennsylvania – 1954) was an American conductor and composer.

Though popular in Europe, even to the point of being the first American to be invited into the Gesellschaft der deutschen Komponisten, Modarelli was never really appreciated at home, being asked to resign by the board of the Pittsburgh Symphony Orchestra in 1936. Other orchestras led by Modarelli include the Wheeling Symphony Orchestra from 1937 to 1942 and West Virginia Symphony Orchestra from 1942 to 1954.

References

External links
Antonio Modarelli Pittsburgh Music History

1954 deaths
American classical composers
American male conductors (music)
American male classical composers
American opera composers
Male opera composers
1894 births
20th-century American conductors (music)
20th-century American male musicians